Anarsia pinnata is a moth of the family Gelechiidae. It was described by Edward Meyrick in 1931. It is found in Cameroon.

References

pinnata
Moths described in 1931
Moths of Africa